Ishwar Ballav (11 July 1937 – 22 March 2008) was one of the most influential Nepali poets. He was also a poet of a new dimension–the third dimension–meaning Tesro Ayam in the history of Nepalese literature. He, along with his contemporaries Bairagi Kaila and Indra Bahadur Rai, formed a trio in 1963 in Darjeeling to rethink and evaluate the development of Nepalese literature.

Bibliography
Aagoka Phoolharu Hun Aagoka Phoolharu Hoinanan
Samanantar
Kashmai Devaya
Euta Saharko Kinarama

See also
List of Nepalese poets

References

Nepalese male writers
Madan Puraskar winners
1937 births
2008 deaths
People from Kathmandu
Sajha Puraskar winners